Legend of the Cybermen is a Big Finish Productions audio drama based on the long-running British science fiction television series Doctor Who. It takes place after The Mind Robber and The Wreck of the Titan.

Plot
The Doctor and Jamie are reunited with Zoe, as the Cybermen attempt to conquer The Land of Fiction.

Cast
The Doctor – Colin Baker
Jamie McCrimmon – Frazer Hines
Zoe Heriot – Wendy Padbury
Artful Dodger/Little Lord Fauntleroy – Steve Kynman
Alice Liddell – Abigail Hollick
Count Dracula/Long John Silver – Ian Gelder
Rob Roy MacGregor – Charlie Ross
Captain Nemo – Alexander Siddig
The Cybermen/The Karkus/Himself – Nicholas Briggs

Notes
Colin Baker and Wendy Padbury were previously heard together in the audio story Davros.  Although Colin played the Sixth Doctor, Wendy did not play Zoe.
The Laird Of McCrimmon was proposed as Jamie's final TV story, but was never made.
Trolls exist within the Land of Fiction and can be turned into Cybermen.

References

External links
Legend of the Cybermen at bigfinish.com

2010 audio plays
Sixth Doctor audio plays
Cybermen audio plays
Works based on Twenty Thousand Leagues Under the Sea
Works based on Alice in Wonderland
Works based on Dracula
Works based on Oliver Twist
Treasure Island